The 2012 Sighetu Marmației explosions took place in the early hours of Sunday, February 19, 2012 in a nightclub in the city of Sighetu Marmației, Romania. The first explosion seriously injured 7 people. Another 10 people were injured in a second explosion, including members of a team of investigators at the scene.

First explosion

The first explosion occurred at around 00:56 EET in a nightclub in Sighetu Marmației. Approximately 120 people were in the club at that time. The nightclub, which was located in the basement of the building, had no central gas connection. A club administrator stated that the nightclub was heated with non-fuel-burning heating and air conditioning equipment, and therefore could not have caused the explosion. The police hypothesis was that the explosion occurred due to accumulation of combustible gases coming not from the club, but from a nearby house. According to investigators, 7 young women were smoking in the club's bathroom, which triggered the explosion.

The women, aged 16 to 23, sustained burns covering 30 to 60% of their bodies, affecting mainly their faces and hands. One of them was admitted into the local hospital, while the other six were flown to the Plastic Surgery, Reconstruction and Burns Emergency Hospital in Bucharest aboard a C-27J Spartan military plane. The girls were assisted during the flight by a SMURD medical team, a mission approved following a request made by the Under-Secretary of State in the Health Ministry, Dr. Raed Arafat.

Second explosion
A second explosion took place at 09:50 EET the following morning. Spokesman of ISU Maramureș, Cornel Băbuț, stated that 10 members of the investigation team were seriously injured with the second blast. Some of the victims were taken to Floreasca Hospital, some to the burns Emergency Service, and the rest of the victims were transported to Bucharest aboard a military plane. Preliminary findings indicated that there was a high concentration of gas in the area. There was a large crack in the welding of the mains pipe that caused the gas leakage. The gas supply was turned off immediately after the second explosion.

Reactions by authorities
The prosecutors' indictment said that the city of Sighetu Marmației "has perpetuated a state of mediocrity, of unprofessionalism, doubled by a thorough clumsy forgery of entire documentation relating to the gas distribution network".

At least 11 people and the gas company were prosecuted for manslaughter, forgery, and abuse of service. Those charged included the former Vice President of the National Agency for Energy Regulation, who knew that the company had no trained employees and did not handle the city gas network with sufficient caution.

References

Maramureș County
2012 disasters in Romania
Sighetu Marmației
Sighetu Marmației
Sighetu Marmației
Nightclub fires
Sighetu Marmației
Sighetu Marmației
Explosions in Romania
February 2012 events in Europe